The  Detroit Lions season was the franchise's 85th season in the National Football League, their 81st as the Detroit Lions and the first under a new coaching staff led by head coach Jim Caldwell. The Lions suffered the passing of long-time owner William Clay Ford, Sr., who died on March 9, 2014, at the age of 88, and wore patches with his initials on their jerseys in his honor.  After the Philadelphia Eagles lost to the Washington Redskins in Week 16, the Lions clinched a playoff berth for the first time since 2011. They lost to the Dallas Cowboys in the Wild Card Game 24–20, ending their season. It was their eighth straight playoff loss, tying the Kansas City Chiefs for the longest postseason losing streak in NFL history.

The Lions defense finished second in the NFL in total defense, surrendering just 300.9 yards per game. They also finished third in points per game defense, giving up just 17.6 points a game while leading the NFL in rushing defense, yielding just 69.3 rush yards per game.

Offseason

Coaching staff
 On December 30, Head coach Jim Schwartz was fired after his fourth losing season in five years.
 On January 14, the Lions hired Jim Caldwell as their new head coach. He is the first African American head coach in the franchise's history.
 On January 17, the Lions hired Teryl Austin as defensive coordinator.
 On January 18, the Lions hired Ron Prince as assistant head coach and tight ends coach.
 On January 21, the Lions hired Joe Lombardi as offensive coordinator.
 On January 25, the Lions hired Robert Prince as receivers coach.

Re-signings

Additions

Departures

Trades

Draft

Notes
 The Lions traded their original fifth-round selection (No. 150 overall) to the Jacksonville Jaguars in exchange for wide receiver Mike Thomas.
 The Lions traded their fifth round pick (146 overall) to Dallas in exchange for a fifth round pick (158 overall) and a seventh round pick (229 overall).

Final roster

Schedule

Preseason

Regular season

Note: Intra-division opponents are in bold.

Postseason

Game summaries

Regular season

Week 1: vs. New York Giants

The Lions hosted their first opening-day Monday Night Football game since 1971, rudely welcoming the New York Giants to town. Matthew Stafford connected with Calvin Johnson on TD passes of 67 and 16 yards in the first quarter, giving Detroit an early 14–0 lead. The Giants got on the board in the second quarter with a 1-yard TD pass from Eli Manning to Larry Donnell, closing the gap to 14–7. Rookie kicker Nate Freese connected on field goals of 28 and 27 yards in the third quarter to extend the Lions lead to 20–7. An interception by Glover Quin, Detroit's second pick of the game, set up the Lions next touchdown, a 5-yard run by Stafford. New York narrowed the lead to 27–14 early in the fourth quarter when Rashad Jennings plunged in from a yard out, but that was as close as the Giants would get. Joique Bell capped the scoring with a 3-yard TD run, and the ensuing 2-point conversion made the final score 35–14.

Week 2: at Carolina Panthers

Carolina's Cam Newton made a successful comeback from a rib injury that kept him out of action in Week 1, but the story of the day was the Panthers' defense. Carolina forced three Detroit turnovers, two of which led to scores. Graham Gano opened the scoring for Carolina in the second quarter with field goals of 29 and 53 yards.  The Lions took a 7–6 lead in the third quarter when Matthew Stafford hit fullback Jed Collins with a 1-yard TD pass. But the rest of the game was all Carolina. Newton closed the third with a 14-yard TD pass to Jason Avant to retake the lead, 13–7. In the fourth quarter, Jonathan Stewart found the end zone on a 2-yard TD run, with the ensuing 2-point conversion giving the Panthers a 21–7 lead.  Gano finished the scoring with a 38-yard field goal.

Week 3: vs. Green Bay Packers

The Lions faced division rival Green Bay in Week 3, with Packers QB Aaron Rodgers sporting a 9–1 record in his last ten games against Detroit. The first two scoring plays for the Lions came courtesy of the defense. Nick Fairley forced a fumble that was scooped up by defensive back Don Carey and returned 40 yards to paydirt to put the Lions up 7–0. After Rodgers tied the game with a 10-yard TD pass to Andrew Quarless, DeAndre Levy tackled running back Eddie Lacy in the end zone for a safety, making the score 9–7. Nate Freese closed the first half scoring with a 30-yard field goal, sending Detroit to the locker room with a 12–7 lead. The only scoring drive of the second half culminated with a Reggie Bush 26-yard TD run, to put Detroit up 19–7.  The Lions defense held Green Bay scoreless for the final three quarters of the game.

Week 4: at New York Jets

After opening the season 3-for-7 on field goal attempts, Detroit kicker Nate Freese was cut during the week and was replaced by Alex Henery.  Henery made good on his first FG attempt for his new team, a 51-yarder to tie the Jets at 3–3 in the first quarter. The Lions put together two TD drives in the second quarter to go up 17–3. First, Matthew Stafford hit Jeremy Ross on a 59-yard bomb. Stafford then connected with first-round draft pick Eric Ebron for a 16-yard TD, giving Ebron his first NFL touchdown. Jets QB Geno Smith hit Eric Decker with an 11-yard TD pass to close the gap to 17–10. Early in the fourth, Stafford found the right pylon for a 1-yard TD run, making the score 24–10. Chris Johnson rambled 35 yards for a touchdown midway through the final quarter, pulling the Jets within a touchdown again, at 24–17. But Detroit's defense was able to force a punt on New York's final possession, and the Lions ran out the clock thereafter.

Week 5: vs. Buffalo Bills

The Lions took a 14–0 lead by early in the second quarter, following a 9-yard touchdown reception by Golden Tate and a 41-yard interception return by Rashean Mathis.  But that would end Detroit's scoring for the day.  Buffalo came back on field goals of 45 and 25 yards by Dan Carpenter, making the score 14–6 by the start of the fourth quarter. Kyle Orton hit Chris Gragg with a 2-yard TD pass, and the ensuing two-point conversion knotted the score at 14–14. With 26 seconds left in the game, Alex Henery missed a 50-yard field goal attempt, his third miss of the day. The Bills quickly moved the ball to the Lions' 40-yard line, setting up Carpenter's game-winning 58-yard field goal with 4 seconds remaining.

Week 6: at Minnesota Vikings

On a day when offensive stars Calvin Johnson and Reggie Bush could not play due to injuries, the Lions defense had to step up, and it did in a big way. Detroit sacked Vikings rookie quarterback Teddy Bridgewater eight times, harassed him into throwing three interceptions, and held the Vikings scoreless until late in the fourth quarter. The Lions got on the board in the first quarter with a 9-yard TD pass from Matthew Stafford to Theo Riddick. Matt Prater, acquired during the week to replace the struggling Alex Henery, made good on a 52-yard field goal near the end of the first half to give the Lions a 10–0 lead. After a scoreless third quarter, Detroit upped its lead to 17–0 on a 1-yard TD plunge by Joique Bell. Blair Walsh got the Vikings on the board with a 40-yard field goal, making the final score 17–3.

Week 7: vs. New Orleans Saints

Playing again without Calvin Johnson, the Lions fell behind the visiting New Orleans Saints by two scores on two separate occasions, before mounting a dramatic comeback in the final minutes of the game. New Orleans had three of the first four scoring plays of the game. Drew Brees hit Austin Johnson with a 14-yard TD pass, Shayne Graham made good on a 27-yard field goal, and Kenny Stills caught a 46-yard TD pass from Brees. Meanwhile, the Lions could only muster a 21-yard field goal by Matt Prater, falling behind 17–3. Detroit closed the gap to 17–10 in the third quarter after a 1-yard TD run by Joique Bell. Two more Shayne Graham field goals, however, gave the Saints a seemingly comfortable 23–10 lead with 5:24 to play in the game. With under four minutes to play, Matthew Stafford connected with Golden Tate on a 73-yard catch-and-run, making the score 23–17. On the Saints' next possession, Glover Quin picked off a third-and-ten Drew Brees pass, returning it to the New Orleans 14-yard line. At the 1:48 mark, Corey Fuller made a leaping catch of a 5-yard TD pass from Stafford for the winning touchdown in a 24–23 game. The Lions' defense held off the Saints in four downs, then the offense ran out the clock for the win.

Week 8: at Atlanta Falcons

In week 8, the Lions flew to London, England to play in the NFL International Series against the Atlanta Falcons at Wembley Stadium. The game was played at 9:30 AM EDT, the first ever NFL game in that time slot. Like the previous game, the Lions were trailing by a large margin (down 21–0 at halftime) before mounting a huge comeback, scoring 22 unanswered points in the second half to win by a single point in the final minutes. The Falcons had touchdown catches of 7 and 1 yards respectively by Devonta Freeman and Bear Pascoe in the first quarter, then a 1-yard run by Steven Jackson in the second quarter. After halftime, a 22-yard Matt Prater field goal and a 59-yard TD pass from Matthew Stafford to Golden Tate narrowed the score to 21–10 by the end of the third quarter. Detroit got the ball on the Atlanta 8-yard line early in the fourth quarter after a Cassius Vaughn interception and return, settling for a 20-yard Prater field goal. A 5-yard touchdown reception by Theo Riddick made the score 21–19, but the Lions failed to convert a two-point conversion. The Falcons had the ball in Lions territory with under two minutes to play, but a holding penalty and a dropped pass both stopped the clock, forcing Atlanta to punt. With no time outs remaining and 1:38 on the clock, Detroit drove from its own 6-yard line to the Atlanta 25 with four seconds remaining in the game. Prater missed a 43-yard field goal attempt, but the whistle had blown before the snap because of a Detroit delay-of-game penalty. Prater then nailed a 48-yarder as time expired for the win.

Calvin Johnson, still recovering from an ankle injury, missed a third straight game for the Lions, who also played without Reggie Bush and its top three tight ends (Eric Ebron, Brandon Pettigrew, and Joseph Fauria). Matthew Stafford's two touchdown passes gave him a team-record 120 in his career, breaking the tie he held with Bobby Layne at 118. The Falcons blew a halftime lead of 21 points or more for the first time in team history. The Lions entered their bye week atop the NFC North with a 6–2 record.

Week 10: vs. Miami Dolphins

Week 10 featured the top-ranked defenses (by yardage against) in each conference, as the Lions hosted the Dolphins. Detroit got off to a quick start. Matt Prater kicked a 26-yard field goal on the opening drive of the game. Later in the first quarter, Calvin Johnson, playing in his first game since Week 5, caught a 49-yard TD pass from Matthew Stafford for a 10–0 lead. Miami managed a 23-yard Caleb Sturgis field goal before halftime, making the score 10–3. The Dolphins took the lead in the third, starting with a 50-yard Stugis field goal. Next, Earl Mitchell blocked Prater's 42-yard field goal attempt, and Dion Jordan returned the ball to the Lions 3-yard line. On the next play, Ryan Tannehill connected with Mike Wallace for the touchdown, putting Miami ahead, 13–10. Prater made good on a 50-yard field goal early in the fourth quarter to knot the score at 13–13, but Sturgis' 20-yarder put Miami back on top by 3. As in the previous two games, the Lions had to rally on their final drive to win the game. Starting at their own 26 with 3:13 left in the game, the drive culminated with Stafford's 11-yard touchdown pass to Theo Riddick, putting the Lions ahead for good, 20–16.

This was the third straight game in which the Lions trailed at the two-minute warning, then went ahead on their final drive. It was the second time in a month that Miami had lost a game in the final seconds, following a Week 7 loss to Green Bay in which the final touchdown was scored with 3 seconds remaining. According to STATS Inc., this is the first time Detroit has started a season 7–2 since 1993.

Week 11: at Arizona Cardinals

In week 11, the 7–2, NFC North-leading Lions flew to Phoenix to face the NFC West's first place team, the 8–1 Arizona Cardinals. In the first quarter, the Cardinals picked up two touchdowns to open the game. Michael Floyd caught a pair of touchdown passes from Drew Stanton, from 42 yards and 12 yards out, giving them an early lead they never relinquished. Detroit's Matt Prater hit a pair of field goals, first a 50-yard kick in the first quarter then a 28-yarder late in the second quarter, to cut the lead to 14–6 at halftime. Neither team scored in the second half. The Lions, plagued by several penalties on both sides of the ball, saw their four-game winning streak snapped.

Week 12: at New England Patriots

In week 12, the Lions flew east for another battle of division leaders, this time with the AFC East's 8–2 New England Patriots. The Lions failed to score a touchdown for the second consecutive week, and fell to second place after a blowout loss. The Lions scored first when Matt Prater hit a 48-yard field goal in the first quarter. The Patriots then took the lead which they kept for the rest of the game when Tim Wright caught a 4-yard touchdown pass from Tom Brady near the end of the first quarter. The Lions responded with a 20-yard field goal in the second quarter. The Patriots then scored two touchdowns on a 3-yard run from LeGarrette Blount, then an 8-yard catch by Tim Wright. New England's Stephen Gostkowski then kicked a 35-yard field goal to make the score 24–6 at halftime. The only score of the third quarter was a Patriots 35 yard field goal. In the final quarter, the Lions scored their third field goal, this one from 49 yards out. The Patriots capped their large victory with a 1-yard touchdown run from LeGarrette Blount.

Week 13: vs. Chicago Bears

After a short week, the Lions hosted their division rivals the Chicago Bears for their 75th annual Thanksgiving Day Game. Detroit spotted Chicago a 14–3 first quarter lead, as Jay Cutler hit Alshon Jeffery with touchdown passes of 10 and 6 yards, wrapped around a Matt Prater 46-yard field goal.  In the second quarter, Calvin Johnson ended his team's nine-quarter touchdown drought by catching a 25-yard TD pass from Matthew Stafford. Before the half ended, Joique Bell scored on a 1-yard run and Stafford again hooked up with Johnson, this time on a 6-yard TD, putting Detroit up 24–14. Robbie Gould closed the gap to seven points with a 35-yard field goal in the third quarter.  Detroit scored the game's final 10 points in the fourth quarter. Joique Bell capped a 95-yard drive with his second 1-yard TD run and Matt Prater hit a 40-yard field goal, making the final score 34–17. The Lions tallied a season-high 474 yards of offense on the day.

Week 14: vs. Tampa Bay Buccaneers

After a long break, the Lions hosted the struggling Tampa Bay Buccaneers. Detroit started the scoring with a 6-yard touchdown catch by Calvin Johnson from Matthew Stafford in the first quarter, giving them a lead they kept for the rest of the game. The Buccaneers responded with a 54-yard field goal by Patrick Murray in the second quarter. The Lions added to their lead with a 1-yard touchdown run by Joique Bell, then a 46-yard field goal by Matt Prater. Tampa Bay ended the second quarter with a 5-yard touchdown catch by Mike Evans from Josh McCown, making the score 17–10 at halftime. The Lions added 10 more points to their lead in the third quarter with a  23-yard field goal from Matt Prater, then a 10-yard Joseph Fauria touchdown catch from Matthew Stafford. In the final quarter, Tampa Bay scored their only points of the second half, with a 26-yard touchdown catch by Mike Evans from Josh McCown. The Lions then capped their victory with a 5-yard touchdown catch by Joique Bell off a deflected Matthew Stafford pass. The win gave Detroit a 9–4 record, the first time for the franchise since 1991, keeping them in the hunt for a spot in the playoffs.

Week 15: vs. Minnesota Vikings

In week 15, the Lions hosted a re-match with their division rival the Minnesota Vikings. Detroit got off to a slow start, as Minnesota scored two touchdowns to take a 14–0 lead by early in the second quarter. Matt Asiata scored first on a 2-yard TD run, and Greg Jennings followed on Minnesota's next possession, catching an 8-yard TD pass from Teddy Bridgewater. Meanwhile, the Lions offense was held without a first down on its first four possessions. The defense helped the Lions narrow the gap by halftime. Glover Quin picked off a Bridgewater pass and returned it to the Vikings 11-yard line. Two plays later, Matthew Stafford hit Golden Tate with a 7-yard TD pass. On Minnesota's next possession, Bridgewater was intercepted again, this time by Darius Slay. That led to a 29-yard Matt Prater field goal, cutting Minnesota's lead to 14–10 at halftime. In the third quarter, the Lions inched closer on a 30-yard Prater field goal, making the score 14–13. It appeared the Vikings would extend their lead when Blair Walsh lined up for a 26-yard field goal try, but Jason Jones partially blocked the kick, and it sailed wide. The Lions went ahead on their next possession when Prater made good on a 33-yard field goal. The final score remained 16–14 Lions, as Minnesota failed to score on its final two possessions. The win gave the Lions a 10–4 record for the first time since 1991 (and only the third time in franchise history, the other being 1970), their fourth consecutive division win (keeping them undefeated in the NFC North), and put them back in first place since Green Bay lost to Buffalo earlier in the day.

Week 16: at Chicago Bears

In Week 16, the Lions traveled west for a re-match with their division rival the Chicago Bears. The Lions entered the game having already clinched a playoff spot, thanks to the Washington Redskins' win over the Philadelphia Eagles the previous day.  Each team scored a touchdown in the first half. First Detroit's Reggie Bush ran one in from 13 yards out in the first quarter, then Chicago's Matt Forte caught an 11-yard pass from Jimmy Clausen late in the second quarter to tie it up at halftime. The Lions took the lead in the third quarter with a 39-yard field goal by Matt Prater, but the Bears went ahead with a 20-yard touchdown pass from Clausen to Alshon Jeffery. In the final quarter, Detroit scored 10 unanswered points for the victory: first a 17-yard touchdown run by Joique Bell, then a 30-yard field goal from Matt Prater. The win was the fifth of the season in which the Lions trailed entering the fourth quarter. It made the Lions 11–4 for the first time since 1991, and kept them undefeated against divisional opponents.

Week 17: at Green Bay Packers

To end the regular season, the Lions visited their division rival, the Green Bay Packers, in a game that determined the NFC North's winner. The Packers took an early lead with a 55-yard punt return touchdown run by Micah Hyde in the opening quarter, and added more points in the second quarter when Randall Cobb caught a 4-yard touchdown pass from Aaron Rodgers. The Lions then scored their only points of the first half when Calvin Johnson caught a 20-yard touchdown pass from Matthew Stafford to make the score 14–7 at halftime. After the break Johnson and Stafford hooked up again with a 4-yard pass to tie the score. Green Bay responded with a 13-yard touchdown catch from Rodgers to Cobb. In the final quarter, the Packers added to their lead when Rodgers ran in a touchdown from 1 yard out. Matthew Stafford was later flagged for intentional grounding in the end zone, giving the Packers a safety. The Lions scored the game's final points when Theo Riddick caught a 6-yard pass from Stafford, and attempted a 2-point conversion but failed. With the loss, the Lions finished the season 11–5, good for 2nd place in the NFC North and a wildcard spot in the playoffs.

Postseason

NFC Wild Card Game: at Dallas Cowboys

Hoping to win their first playoff game since the 1991 season, the Lions visited the Dallas Cowboys. Detroit took an early lead in the first quarter with a pair of touchdowns, first on a 51-yard reception by Golden Tate, then an 18-yard run by Reggie Bush. Dallas responded in the second quarter with a 76-yard touchdown catch by Terrance Williams. The Lions added three more points with a 39-yard Matt Prater field goal just before halftime to make the score 17–7. After the break, Detroit increased their lead  with another Prater field goal, this one from 37 yards. The Cowboys responded with a 1-yard touchdown run by DeMarco Murray. In the final quarter, Dallas cut the lead to three with a 51-yard field goal from Dan Bailey, and went ahead with an 8-yard touchdown catch by Terrance Williams. This final touchdown capped a 59-yard drive that came after a controversially changed pass interference call against the Cowboys, which would have given the Lions a first down near the Dallas 30-yard line. The Cowboys took over and sealed a date with Green Bay.

Standings

Division

Conference

Staff

References

External links
 

Detroit
Detroit Lions seasons
2014 in sports in Michigan